Maldives competed at the 2015 Indian Ocean Island Games in Réunion, from 1 August to 8 August 2015.

Medal table

Medalists

Athletics

Men

Women

Badminton

Men

Singles

Doubles

Team

Women

Singles

Doubles

Team

Basketball

Men

Women

Football

Men

Women

Handball

Women

Sailing

Men

Women

Swimming

Men

Women

Table tennis

Men
Singles

Doubles

Women
Singles

Doubles

Tennis

Men
Singles
Doubles
Team

Women
Singles
Doubles
Team

Volleyball

Men

Women

Weightlifting

Men

Preparation and sponsorships
The Gujarat Cooperative Milk Marketing Federation, that manages dairy cooperative Amul, announced its memorandum of understanding (MoU) with the Indian Olympic Association on 11 July 2014. This MoU has made Amul the official sponsor of the Indian contingent at the 2014 Asian Games and Commonwealth Games, which was held in Glasgow, Scotland.

References

Indian Ocean Island Games